Vimont can refer to:

Places

Canada
Vimont, Quebec, a district in Laval, Quebec, Canada
Vimont (electoral district), an electoral district in Laval, Quebec, Canada
Vimont (AMT), a commuter train station in Greater Montreal, Canada
Vimont Lake, a water body of the unorganized territory Lac-Ashuapmushuan, Quebec, Canada

France
Vimont, Calvados, a commune in France

People
 Barthélemy Vimont, S.J. (1594-1667)
 Pierre Vimont (1949- )

See also
Guimond

Surnames of Norman origin